is a 24-episode anime television adaptation of Romeo and Juliet, a 16th-century tragedy originally written by William Shakespeare. The English playwright himself makes a cameo appearance in the series as a minor character. The series was produced jointly by Gonzo and SKY Perfect Well Think, with Fumitoshi Oizaki as the main director. It was first broadcast in Japan on Chubu-Nippon Broadcasting between April 4, 2007 and September 26, 2007. It was later broadcast by other Japanese television networks such as TBS, KBS Kyōto and SUN-TV. It was broadcast in Hungary by Animax and in Italy by Rai 4. The chief screenwriter for the series was Reiko Yoshida. The music was composed by Hitoshi Sakimoto and performed by Eminence Symphony Orchestra with Tomohiro Yoshida as sound director. The series used three pieces of theme music. "Good Bye, Yesterday" by Mizrock was the ending theme for episodes 15 to 23. "Inori: You Raise Me Up" by Lena Park was used as a special ending for episode 24. The anime is licensed in North America by Funimation. The complete series was released in two sections, with the first half of the series, the Romeo Collection being released June 23, 2009 and the second half of the series, the Juliet Collection being released August 11, 2009.

Episode list

References

External links
Romeo × Juliet official website 
Romeo X Juliet on Animax Asia

Romeo x Juliet
Romeo x Juliet